Pope Urban IV (1261–1264) created fourteen new cardinals in two consistories. The exact dates of these consistories are not clear. Contemporary reports suggest that they were held on 24 December 1261 ("Saturday before Christmas") and in May 1262. However, some modern authors contest the accuracy of these reports as contradicting the established custom of that time, according to which the promotions of cardinals were celebrated on Saturdays of the Ember weeks, which fell on 17 December 1261 and 3 June 1262 respectively.

Consistory of December 1261
Guido Foucois, archbishop of Narbonne – Cardinal-bishop of Sabina, then elected Pope Clement IV (5 February 1265), † 28 November 1268
Raoul Grosparmi, bishop of Évreux – Cardinal-bishop of Albano, † 11 August 1270
Simone Paltineri – Cardinal-priest of SS. Silvestro e Martino, † February 1277
Simon de Brion – Cardinal-priest of S. Cecilia, then elected Pope Martin IV (22 February 1281), † 28 March 1285
Uberto Coconati – Cardinal-deacon of S. Eustachio, † 13 July 1276
Giacomo Savelli – Cardinal-deacon of S. Maria in Cosmedin, then elected Pope Honorius IV (2 April 1285), † 3 April 1287
Goffredo da Alatri – Cardinal-deacon of S. Giorgio in Velabro, † before 31 May 1287

Consistory of May 1262 
Enrico Segusio, archbishop of Embrun – Cardinal-bishop of Ostia e Velletri, † 6/7 November 1271
Ancher Pantaleon, papal nephew – Cardinal-priest of S. Prassede, † 1 November 1286
Guillaume de Bray – Cardinal-priest of S. Marco, † 29 April 1282
Guy de Bourgogne, O.Cist. – Cardinal-priest of S. Lorenzo in Lucina, † 20 May 1272
Annibale Annibaldi, O.P. – Cardinal-priest of SS. XII Apostoli, † 15 October 1272
Giordano Pironti, Vicechancellor of the Holy Roman Church – Cardinal-deacon of SS. Cosma e Damiano, † 9 October 1269
Matteo Rosso Orsini – Cardinal-deacon of S. Maria in Portico, † 4 September 1305

Notes

Sources

Konrad Eubel: Hierarchia Catholica Medii Aevi, Vol. 1, Münster 1913, p. 8 
Fischer, Andreas: Kardinäle im Konklave. Die lange Sedisvakanz der Jahre 1268 bis 1271. Bibliothek des Deutschen Historischen Instituts in Rom, 118.  Max Niemeyer Verlag. Tübingen 2008 

College of Cardinals
Urban IV
Cardinals created by Pope Urban IV
Urb